Pongumoodu (or Pongummoodu) is a small suburb of Trivandrum (Thiruvananthapuram), capital of Kerala, India. Centred on National Highway NH-47, the 'Junction' so commonly called as features Banks, Grocery stores, Pay Phone booths, a grinding mill, a stationery store, bakery, tailoring stores, pharmacies, a Government approved ration shoppe, driving school, computer sale outlet, internet cafe, a technical institute, convent mission supported schools, opticians, household bathroom decors and decent neighbourhoods. Also in proximity to Aakulam's Indian Air Force base.

Residents include natives (both current residents and non-residents), people from sister states and internationals bringing contributions to research and development studies in the area.
Pongumoodu even offers a 350 bedded hospital, the famous Sree Uthram Thirunal Royal Hospital, A multispeciality hospital with excellent facilities. There is also an upcoming Cancer Centre.

Pongumoodu also features auto-rickshaw stands, taxi stands and bus stops supporting transportation. ( If you're hiring an auto or a taxi to go here you might want to say "Ulloor Pongumoodu" instead because of another place of the same name in the State but close to Trivandrum. Ulloor is the nearby town on the way to the city from here. Nearby colonies include Bapuji Nagar, Prasanth Nagar, Priyadarshini, Janasakthi Nagar, Bethany Nagar & Archana Nagar.

In the range of a 5.5-mile (9 km) radius from Technopark KeralaTechnoPark, a Technological venture park for foreign and domestic investors.

Lingo is Malayalam with an accent custom to Trivandrum (or now called Thiruvananthapuram) with many custom slangs and sayings among youth.

Ulloor

Suburbs of Thiruvananthapuram